Abroteia is a genus of red algae. The type species for this genus is Abroteia orbicularis J.Agardh.

References

Delesseriaceae
Red algae genera